In X-ray diffraction, the Rachinger correction is a method for accounting for the effect of an undesired K-alpha 2 peak in the energy spectrum. Ideally, diffraction  measurements are made with X-rays of a single wavelength. Practically, the x-rays for a measurement are usually generated in an X-ray tube from a metal's K-alpha line. This generation creates x-rays at a variety of wavelengths, but most of the non K-alpha X-rays can be blocked from reaching the sample by filters. However, the K-alpha line is actually two x-ray lines close together: the stronger K-alpha 1 peak, and the weaker K-alpha 2 peak. Compared to other radiation such as the Bremsstrahlung, the K-alpha two peak is more difficult to filter mechanically. The Rachinger correction is a recursive method suggested by William Albert Rachinger (1927) to eliminate the disturbing  peak.

Cause of the double peak 
For diffraction experiments with X-rays radiation is usually used with the  Wavelength of the anode material . However, this is a doublet, so in reality two slightly different wavelengths. According to the diffraction conditions of the Laue or Bragg equation, both wavelengths each generate an intensity maximum. These maxima are very close to each other, with their distance depending on the diffraction angle . For larger angles, the distance of the intensity maxima is greater.

Procedure

Basics 

From this, the angular distance can be determined for each diffraction angle   determine the two Kα peaks.

This ratio is determined quantum mechanically and is for all anode materials:

Calculation 
The total intensity is:

,

where  is the intensity of the pure  peak and  the intensity of the pure  peak.

The intensity of  peak can be expressed as:

,

so the overall intensity is:

Practical Implementation 

To practically perform the Rachinger correction, one starts on a rising edge of a peak. At the point  can the true intensity  (which, if there is no peak) would be calculated by:
.

Since the measured values of X-ray diffraction experiments are usually available as ASCII tables, this procedure can be repeated step by step until the entire diffraction pattern has been run through.

Today this method is hardly used anymore. Due to the power of the computers, the  peak can be fit simultaneously.

Restrictions 
From the way the corrected diffraction image is calculated, it follows that no correction is made for the small diffraction angles. Furthermore, the assumption Rachinger that it is   Peak just a scaled variant of the  peaks are not correct, as the lines generally have different widths. Therefore, in reality there is a deviation in form and intensity. Also, the correction loses its validity for a non-negligible background, since this itself causes an unwanted correction.

Literature

References 

X-ray crystallography